Louis-Nicolas Cabat (6 December 1812, Paris – 13 March 1893, Paris) was a French landscape painter.

He was one of the most illustrious students of Camille Flers. A member of the Accademia di San Luca in Rome, Cabat was elected a member of the Académie des Beaux-Arts of the Institut de France in 1867 and was director of the French Academy in Rome from 1879 to 1884.

In 1883 Cabat travelled in France with his friends Constant Troyon and Jules Dupré in search of landscapes.

Works 
Cabaret à Montsouris
Le Moulin de Dompierre
Les Bords de la Bouzanne
L'intérieur d'un Bois
L'Étang de Ville-d'Avray
Le Bois de Fontenay-aux-Roses
Intérieur d'un Métaierie dans le Calvados
La Gorge-Aux-Loups (seine et marne)
Fête de la Vierge à l'eau,
Oiseleur à l'affût
Chemin dans la vallée de Narni
Solitude

References
 :fr:Louis-Nicolas Cabat
 

1812 births
1893 deaths
19th-century French painters
French male painters
French Realist painters
Members of the Académie des beaux-arts
19th-century French male artists